During World War II, the United States Army Air Forces (USAAF) established airfields in Wisconsin for training pilots and aircrews of USAAF fighters and bombers.

Most of these airfields were under the command of First Air Force or the Army Air Forces Training Command (AAFTC) (A predecessor of the current-day United States Air Force Air Education and Training Command).  However the other USAAF support commands (Air Technical Service Command (ATSC); Air Transport Command (ATC) or Troop Carrier Command) commanded a significant number of airfields in a support roles.

It is still possible to find remnants of these wartime airfields. Many were converted into municipal airports, some were returned to agriculture and several were retained as United States Air Force installations and were front-line bases during the Cold War. Hundreds of the temporary buildings that were used survive today, and are being used for other purposes.

Major Airfields
Air Technical Service Command
 General Billy Mitchell Field, Milwaukee
 364th Base Headquarters and Air Base Squadron, 25 May 1942-31 March 1944
 567th Army Air Force Base Unit, 31 March 1944-15 August 1944
 4302nd Army Air Force Base Unit, 15 August 1944-1 September 1944
 Now: General Mitchell International Airport and  General Mitchell Air National Guard Base 

Army Air Force Training Command
 Truax Field, Madision
 Army Air Forces Technical School (Radio No. 3), 22 July 1942-1 November 1945
 334th Base Headquarters and Air Base Squadron, 23 July 1942-30 April 1944
 3508th Army Air Force Base Unit, 1 May 1944-30 November 1945
 Now: Dane County Regional Airport and  Truax Field Air National Guard Base 

First Air Force
 Camp Williams Army Air Field, Finley, Wisconsin
 363rd Base Headquarters and Air Base Squadron, June 1942-October 1943
 Now:  Volk Field Air National Guard Base

References
 Maurer, Maurer (1983). Air Force Combat Units Of World War II. Maxwell AFB, Alabama: Office of Air Force History. .
 Ravenstein, Charles A. (1984). Air Force Combat Wings Lineage and Honors Histories 1947–1977. Maxwell AFB, Alabama: Office of Air Force History. .
 Thole, Lou (1999), Forgotten Fields of America : World War II Bases and Training, Then and Now - Vol. 2.  Pictorial Histories Pub . 
 Military Airfields in World War II - Wisconsin

 01
World War II
World War II
World War II
Airfields of the United States Army Air Forces in the United States by state
United States World War II army airfields